John Laughlin may refer to:
John Laughlin (Canadian politician) (1879–1941), Canadian politician
John Laughlin (actor) (born 1953), American actor
John Laughlin (New York politician) (1856–1905), New York politician
Clarence John Laughlin (1905–1985), American photographer

See also
John Laughlin McIsaac
John Loughlin (disambiguation)
John McLaughlin (disambiguation)